Aggression is overt or covert social interaction with the intention of inflicting damage or other harm upon another individual or group.

Aggression may also refer to:

 Aggression (poker), plays such as opens, raises and a check-raise
 The Aggression, a 1988 German film
 Agression (band), an American rock band
 Crime of aggression, the illegal use of state military force
 Non-aggression principle, the initiation of force (or force substitute) against another moral agent
 War of aggression, a military conflict waged without international legality
 WWF Aggression, a 2000 hip hop album